Theresa Muigg (born 15 June 1984) is an Austrian politician of the Social Democratic Party (SPÖ) who has been serving as a Member of the European Parliament since 2022.

References

See also 

 List of members of the European Parliament for Austria, 2019–2024

1984 births
Living people
People from Schwaz
MEPs for Austria 2019–2024
21st-century Austrian politicians
21st-century Austrian women politicians
Social Democratic Party of Austria MEPs
Social Democratic Party of Austria politicians
21st-century women MEPs for Austria